Choquette is a surname. Notable people with the surname include:

Buck Choquette, Canadian prospector
Auguste Choquette, Member of Parliament for Lotbinière
Fernand Choquette, former judge of the Quebec Court of Appeal
Hector Choquette, Member of the Legislative Assembly of Quebec
Jack Choquette (1928–2013), American racing driver
Jérôme Choquette, Member of the Legislative Assembly of Quebec
Michel Choquette, humorist
Natalie Choquette, Canadian soprano
Philippe-Auguste Choquette, Member of Parliament for Montmagny
Robert Choquette, writer and diplomat